Estep is a surname. Notable people with the surname include:

 Harry Allison Estep (1884–1968), member of the United States House of Representatives from Pennsylvania
 Joanna Estep (21st century), illustrator, writer and cartoonist
 Maggie Estep (1963-2014), American poet and writer
 Mary Jo Estep (1909 or 1910-1992), a Shoshone child survivor of the Battle of Kelley Creek
 Preston Estep (21st century), American biologist
 William Roscoe Estep (1920-2000), American Baptist historian and professor